Camugnano is a comune (municipality) in the Metropolitan City of Bologna in the Italian region Emilia-Romagna, located about  southwest of Bologna.  
 
Camugnano borders the following municipalities: Cantagallo, Castel di Casio, Castiglione dei Pepoli, Grizzana Morandi, Sambuca Pistoiese, Vernio.

References

External links
  Official website

Cities and towns in Emilia-Romagna